Kissel or kisel (Livonian: kīsõl) is a simple dish with the consistency of a thick gel. It belongs to the group of cold-solidified desserts, although it can be served warm. If the kissel is made less thick, it can be drunk — this is common in Poland, Russia and Ukraine.

Grain kissel / etymology and history 

It's name is derived from a Slavic word meaning "sour", after a similar old Slavic dish—a leavened flour porridge (or weak sourdough) which was made from grain—most commonly oats, but any grain, and even legumes like peas or lentils could be used, though bean kissels usually were not leavened—and lacked the sweetness of the modern variants. Kissel is first mentioned in the old East Slavic Primary Chronicle where there is a story of how it saved the 10th-century Rus' city of Belgorod Kievsky, besieged by nomadic Pechenegs in 997. When the food in the city became scarce and a hunger started, the inhabitants of the city followed an advice of an old man, who told them to make kissel from the remnants of grain, and a sweet drink from the last mead they could find. Then they filled a wooden container with the kissel, and another one with the mead drink, put those containers into the holes in the ground and made up two fake wells over them. When the Pechenegian ambassadors came into the town, they saw how the inhabitants took the food from those "wells", and the Pechenegs even were allowed to taste the kissel and mead beverage. Impressed by that show and degustation, Pechenegs decided to lift the siege and to go away, having concluded that the Ruthenians were mysteriously fed from the earth itself.

Fruit kissel 
Fruit kissel is a viscous fruit dish, popular as a dessert and as a drink in Northern, Central and Eastern Europe. Sometimes red wine or fresh or dried fruits are added. It is similar to the Danish rødgrød and German Rote Grütze. Swedish blåbärssoppa is a similarly prepared bilberry dessert. Kissel can be served either hot or cold, also together with sweetened quark or cream. Kissel can also be served on pancakes or with ice cream. 

Nowadays most Polish households prepare fruit kissel from instant mixes instead of the traditional way. The most popular flavours are strawberry, gooseberry, and raspberry. In Russia, the most popular flavours are cranberry, cherry, and redcurrant. Cranberry kissel is a traditional meal on Kūčios (Christmas Eve supper) in Lithuania. In Finland, kissel is often made of bilberries (since those can often be found growing wild in the forests and are thus both easy to gather and free) as well as from prunes, apricots, strawberries, etc. The thickness can vary depending on how much potato flour is used: thin bilberry soup is most easily consumed by drinking while the thickest version is almost like jelly and is eaten with a spoon. Rhubarb can also be used, but it is often combined with strawberries to make it less tart. Kuningatarkiisseli ("Queen's kissel") is made with mixed berries and berry juices, usually at least bilberries and raspberries. Prune kiisseli (luumukiisseli) is traditionally eaten with rice pudding at Christmas.

Vegetable kissel 
Less common dessert made in the image of fruit kissel. Based on boiled or baked vegetables such as rhubarb, pumpkins, beetroot etc.

Milk kissel 
() A similar dish to semolina pudding or budino. It is made from milk and potato starch (Poland) or corn starch (Finland), and flavoured with sugar and vanillin (or vanilla) or cocoa powder. Eaten as a dessert, alone or garnished with fruit syrups, fruit sauces, fruit jams, fresh or dried fruit, cookies, biscuits etc. Used, among others, as an ingredient in cake creams (i.e. for karpatka or napoleonka).

Nowadays most Polish households prepare milk kissel from instant mixes instead of the traditional way.

''

Cultural references
In Russian fairy tales, the land of marvels (similar to Cockaigne) is described as the land of "milk rivers and kissel banks". This expression became an idiom in Russian for prosperous life or "paradise on earth".

Another phrase common in Russia and Poland, "the seventh water after kissel", is used to describe a distant relative.

See also

 Almond jelly
 Blåbärssoppa
 Compote
 Kompot
 List of desserts
 List of fruit dishes
 Tong sui

References

External links

Recipes 
Apple-Cranberry Kissel with Sweet Sour Cream
Berry Kissel recipe
Hot Cranberry Kissel
Summer Berry Basil Kissel

Polish desserts
Polish drinks
Lithuanian desserts

Russian desserts
Russian drinks
Custard desserts
Ukrainian cuisine
Finnish cuisine
Estonian desserts
Soviet cuisine
Fruit dishes
Lithuanian drinks
Milk dishes
Grain dishes